Multikulti is an album by jazz trumpeter Don Cherry recorded between 1988 and 1990 and released in 1991 on the A&M label.

Reception

The AllMusic review by Michael G. Nastos stated: "As a standalone single CD, this recording, done over a three-year period and more than any other from Don Cherry, represents a full spectrum overview of all the phases in his nomadic adult musical life". The Calgary Herald dismissed the album as "another selection of National Geographic sounds."

Writer Michael Stephans commented that "the recording is vintage world music Cherry, and is mostly very enjoyable."

Track listing
All compositions by Don Cherry except as indicated
 "Trumpet" – 0:45   
 "Multikulti Soothsayer" - 5:26   
 "Flute" – 1:08   
 "Birdboy - 4:41   
 "Melodica" - 1:26   
 "Dedication To Thomas Mapfumo" - 4:23   
 "Pettiford Bridge" (Carlos Ward) - 4:44   
 "Piano / Trumpet" - 2:25   
 "Until The Rain Comes" (Peter Apfelbaum) - 12:17   
 "Divinity-Tree" - 5:14   
 "Rhumba Multikulti" (Don Cherry, Josh Jones, Robert Huffman) - 4:10   
 "Multikulti Soothsayer Player" - 4:27   
Recorded at Paramount Studios in Hollywood, California (track 4) on 27 December 1988, at Fantasy Recording Studios in Berkeley, California on 7 November 1989 (tracks 9 & 10) and 8 November 1989 (track 11), at BMG Recording Studios in New York City on 20 November 1989 (tracks 6 & 7) and 20 January 1990 (tracks 1, 3, 5, 8 & 12), and at Serafine Studios in Santa Monica, California, on 23 February 1990 (track 2)

Personnel
Don Cherry — pocket trumpet, doussn'gouni, vocals, flute, melodica, piano
A Watts Prophet, Anthony Hamilton, Ingrid Sertso - vocals
Frank Serafine, David Cherry - synthesizer
John L. Price - drum programming
Bo Freeman - bass
Mark London Sims - bass
Karl Berger - marimba, vocals
Bob Stewart - tuba
Carlos Ward - alto saxophone
Naná Vasconcelos - percussion
Ed Blackwell, Deszon X. Claiborne - drums
Peter Apfelbaum - tenor saxophone, cowbell, marimba, organ, synthesizer, bells, gong, palitos, vocals
Jessica Jones, Tony Jones - tenor saxophone
Joshua Jones - drums, timbales, cowbell, vocals
Robert Huffman - congas, bell tree, vocals 
Peck Allmond - baritone saxophone
Jeff Cressman - trombone, vocals
Frank Ekeh - shekere, dunun, vocals 
Stan Franks, Will Bernard - guitar
James Harvey - trombone
Bill Ortiz - trumpet, vocals
Allen Ginsberg, Claudia Engelhart, Karen Knight - chorus

References

A&M Records albums
Don Cherry (trumpeter) albums
1990 albums